In geometric topology, a branch of mathematics, the Bing shrinking criterion, introduced by , is a method for showing that a quotient of a space is homeomorphic to the space.

References

Geometric topology